Sheikh Khalifa bin Hamad bin Abdullah bin Jassim bin Mohammed Al Thani   (17 September 1932 – 23 October 2016) was the Emir of Qatar from 27 February 1972 until he was deposed by his son Hamad bin Khalifa on 27 June 1995. 
The son accused his father of treason and demanded that Interpol arrest him. The former Emir charges his father with 4 charges that include his execution.

He died during the reign of his grandson, the current Emir, Tamim bin Hamad Al Thani.

Early years
Sheikh Khalifa was born in Doha in 1932. He was the son of Hamad bin Abdullah Al Thani and grandson of Abdullah bin Jassim Al Thani.

Career
In 1957, Khalifa was appointed Minister of Education. Then, he was appointed Deputy Emir. He was named as the heir apparent on 24 October 1960. In the 1960s, he also served as Prime Minister and Minister of Finance.

On 22 February 1972, Sheikh Khalifa became the Emir of Qatar, seizing power from his cousin, Emir Ahmad bin Ali Al Thani in a bloodless coup d'état. While many Western news outlets referred to it as an overthrow, the Qatari population merely considered it to be a succession of power. His initial activity was the process of the reorganization of the government. He also limited the financial privileges of members of the ruling family. Next, he appointed a foreign minister and an adviser to himself regarding the day-to-day affairs. On 19 April 1972, he amended the Constitution and expanded the Cabinet by appointing more ministers. Diplomatic relations were also established with a number of foreign countries at the
ambassadorial level.

Khalifa's reorganization of the system of government saw a dramatic shift in the hierarchy of authority. He immensely reduced the traditional powers afforded to the heir-apparent while projecting all of the power onto himself.

On 18 July 1989, the cabinet was reshuffled for the first time, replacing most of the previous ministers and making it consist of 15 ministers. The Cabinet was again reshuffled under his premiership on 1 September 1992, expanding it to 17 members.

The state revenue from the oil sector had increased as the result of the rising of a number of production sharing agreements with foreign oil companies. Two production-sharing agreements were signed with the Standard Oil Company of Ohio in January 1985 and Amoco in February 1986. In January 1989, another production sharing agreement was signed between Qatar and the French state-owned oil company Elf Aquitaine. In the middle of 1991, production of gas in the Qatar North Field, the world's largest single field of non-associated gas (proven gas reserves of around 250 trillion cubic feet and probable reserves of 500 trillion cubic feet), commenced. While the search for finding more oil deposits in Qatar continued, Qatar built an industrial base in order to reduce dependence on the oil sector.

Dethronement and death
While Khalifa bin Hamad Al Thani was staying in Geneva, Switzerland, in June 1995, his son Hamad bin Khalifa seized power in another bloodless coup d'état. 
The son accused his father of treason and demanded that Interpol arrest him. The former Emir charges his father with 4 charges that include his execution.
Khalifa lived in France until he returned to Qatar in 2004. He died on 23 October 2016 at the age of 84.

Marriages and children

Sheikh Khalifa had five sons and twelve daughters from four wives.

Sheikha Amna bint Hassan bin Abdullah Al Thani
Sheikh Abdelaziz bin Khalifa, Petroleum and finance minister (1972–1992)
Sheikha Maryem Bint Khalifa 
Sheikha Noora bint Khalifa
Sheikha Hissa bint Khalifa
Sheikha Jafla bint Khalifa
Sheikha Moza bint Khalifa
Sheikha Aisha bint Hamad Al Attiyah
Sheikh Hamad bin Khalifa, Emir of Qatar from 1995 to 2013.
Sheikha Rudha bint Jassim bin Jabr Al Thani
Sheikha Aisha Bint Khalifa 
Sheikha Sheikha bint Khalifa 
Sheikh Abdullah Bin Khalifa
Sheikha Amna Bint Khalifa 
Sheikh Mohammed bin Khalifa 
Sheikha Lolwa Bint Khalifa 
Sheikha Amal Bint Khalifa 
Sheikha Al Anoud bint Khalifa 
Sheikha Moza bint Ali bin Saud Al Thani
Sheikh Jassim bin Khalifa
Sheikha Nouf bint Khalifa

References

Thani, Khalifa bin Hamid
2016 deaths
Qatari Muslims
Emirs of Qatar
Muslim monarchs
Khalifa bin Hamad
Government ministers of Qatar
Prime Ministers of Qatar
Finance ministers of Qatar
Leaders who took power by coup
Leaders ousted by a coup

Honorary Knights Grand Cross of the Order of the Bath
Honorary Knights Grand Cross of the Order of St Michael and St George
20th-century Arabs
Recipients of orders, decorations, and medals of Sudan